Senator Tarr may refer to:

Bruce Tarr (born 1964), Massachusetts State Senate
Eric Tarr (born 1972), West Virginia State Senate